Kayo Inaba is a professor at Kyoto University where she heads the Graduate School of Biostudies. She is also the Vice-President for Gender Equality and the Director of the Centre for Women Researchers.

Inaho is known for her work on dendritic cells and she won the Asia pacific UNESCO Awards for Women in Science in 2014. She has shown the importance of dendritic cells to the immune system and how they can live outside of the body.

Life
Inaba graduated from the Kyoto University with a Ph.D. in 1978.
From  1982 until 2011, She was visiting faculty member in Ralph Steinman’s lab.
She is executive vice-president for gender equality, international affairs, public relations, and director of the International Strategy Office at Kyoto University.
Inaba was the first female associate professor in the science department at Kyoto University. 
Inaba is on the board of the Japanese Society for Immunology.

Works

References

Academic staff of Kyoto University
Japanese biologists
L'Oréal-UNESCO Awards for Women in Science laureates
21st-century women scientists